Essam Al-Muwallad (born 11 March 1999) is a Saudi professional footballer who plays as a midfielder for Al-Ittihad.

Career

Al-Ittihad
Al-Muwallad started his career with Al-Ittihad where he was promoted from the youth team to the first team. On 31 January 2019, Al-Muwallad signed his first professional contract with the club. On 9 April 2019, Al-Muwallad made his first-team debut in the AFC Champions League group stage match against Lokomotiv Tashkent.

Al-Bukayriyah (loan)
On 1 February 2020, Al-Muwallad joined Al-Bukayriyah on loan until the end of the season. He made his debut as well as score his first goal for the club on 12 February 2020 in the league match against Al-Ansar.

Al-Hazem (loan)
On 9 October 2020, Al-Muwallad joined Al-Hazem on loan until the end of the season.

Career statistics

Club

Honours
Al-Hazem
MS League: 2020–21

References

External links 
 

1999 births
Living people
Saudi Arabian footballers
Ittihad FC players
Al-Bukayriyah FC players
Al-Hazem F.C. players
Al-Kholood Club players
Association football midfielders
Saudi Professional League players
Saudi First Division League players